Prospect United F.C. was an English association football club based in Hoyland, Barnsley, South Yorkshire.

History
The club was formed after the end of the First World War, and played in the Barnsley Association League (winning the title twice) and the FA Cup.

Honours
Barnsley Association League
Champions - 1920/21, 1924/25

Records
Best FA Cup performance: 1st Qualifying Round, three occasions

References

Defunct football clubs in South Yorkshire
Association football clubs established in the 20th century